Doane may refer to:

Surname  
 Brigham Doane (born 1981), American professional hardcore wrestler
 D. Howard Doane (1883–1984), American agricultural expert
 George Washington Doane (1799–1859), American churchman and bishop
 Gustavus Cheyney Doane (1840–1892), U.S. Army Cavalry, member of Washburn-Langford-Doane Expedition
 Henry Doane (1905–1999), American landscape painter and commercial artist
 John Doane (c. 1590–1685/6), early settler of Eastham, Massachusetts
 J. Chalmers Doane (born 1938), Canadian musician and educator
 Ken Doane (born 1986), American professional wrestler
 Mary Ann Doane (born 1952), American professor 
 Melanie Doane (born 1967), Canadian pop singer-songwriter 
 Percy Gray Doane (1877–1945), American philatelic dealer
 Rennie Wilbur Doane (1871–1942), American entomologist
 Seth Doane (born 1978), American journalist
 , co-founder of Doane College
 William Croswell Doane (1832–1913), American Bishop of the Episcopal church
 William Howard Doane (1832–1915), American hymn writer

Given name 
 Doane Perry (born 1954), American musician
 Doane Robinson (1856–1946), American historian and father of the Mount Rushmore National Memorial

Other uses
Doane University, a private college in Crete, Nebraska
Doane, West Virginia, a community in the United States
Doane Road or Regional Road 45 runs from Holland Landing to south of Queensville in York Region, Ontario, Canada

See also
 Doan (disambiguation)
 Duane (disambiguation)
 Doane Peak
 Doane Rock
 Doane's Falls
 St. Mary's Hall - Doane Academy
 Doane Stuart School